Panthaplavu is a small village located in Pathanapuram, Kollam district, Kerala, India.  
This area is located in between PATTAZY and PATHANAPUAM area.

References

Villages in Kollam district